Thomas Daly (born 16 February 1991) is an Australian basketball player for the Mount Gambier Pioneers of the NBL1 South.

Early life
Daly was born in Adelaide, South Australia, and attended Unley High School.

NBL and State League career
Daly made his semi-professional debut in 2009 with the Sturt Sabres of the Central Australian Basketball League. He helped the Sabres win the 2010 Central ABL championship, scoring 26 points in the final. He was also the Frank Angove Medalist in 2010 which is awarded to best U/23 player in Central ABL.

Following the 2010 Central ABL season, Daly joined the Adelaide 36ers as a development player for the 2010–11 NBL season. Due to injuries in the 36ers squad, Daly saw increased playing time over the season. He averaged 2.2 points in 8.35 minutes in 13 games.

After playing a third season in the Central ABL with the Sabres, Daly re-joined the 36ers as a development player for the 2011–12 NBL season and in 12 games, he averaged 1.8 points per game.

With the Sabres in 2012, Daly won the Woollacott Medal for fairest and most brilliant in the Central ABL. He was also named the Most Valuable Player and All-Star Five.

Daly was again one of the 36ers' development players going into the 2012–13 NBL season. In December 2012, he was elevated to the main roster after import C. J. Massingale was released. In 17 games, he averaged 2.6 points and 1.1 rebounds per game.

In 2013, Daly joined the Mount Gambier Pioneers of the South East Australian Basketball League (SEABL). In 2014, he helped the Pioneers win the SEABL championship.

On 10 September 2014, Daly signed a full-time contract with the 36ers for the 2014–15 NBL season. He scored 19 points in 27 games.

Between 2015 and 2018, Daly played for the Pioneers in the SEABL and won two more championships in 2015 and 2017. He averaged 16.7 points, 3.2 rebounds and 4.9 assists per game in 2017 and was named in the all SEABL team and won the Grand Final MVP.

In 2019, Daly played for the Pioneers in the Premier League.

In 2021 and 2022, Daly played for the Pioneers in the NBL1 South.

National team career
In June 2009, Daly represented Australia at the FIBA Oceania Basketball Tournament in Saipan. The team went undefeated in the round robin and finals, going 6–0 to win the gold medal. Daly was named in the All Star Five for the tournament.

In August 2011, Daly played for the Australian University National Team at the World University Games in Shenzhen.

References

External links
Adelaide 36ers profile

1991 births
Living people
Adelaide 36ers players
Australian men's basketball players
Basketball players from South Australia
Point guards
20th-century Australian people
21st-century Australian people